Alegon is a village in the Bago Region of north-west Myanmar. It lies in Kyaukkyi Township in the Taungoo District.

See also
List of cities, towns and villages in Burma: A

References

Populated places in Bago Region